Robin D. Laws (born October 14, 1964 in Orillia, Ontario, Canada) is a Canadian writer and game designer who lives in Toronto, Canada. He is the author of a number of novels and role-playing games as well as an anthologist.

Career
Robin D. Laws has been a professional game designer and an author since the early 1990s.

Game designer
Robin D. Laws has been playing role-playing games since he was a teenager and has worked as a game designer since the early 1990s. John Nephew of Atlas Games convinced Jonathan Tweet to publish a game he had been writing about in Alarums & Excursions; Laws talked with Tweet about the game in A&E and contributed to the final product as well, the result of which was Over the Edge (1992). Daedalus Games began when Laws approached Jose Garcia in 1993 with an idea for a Hong Kong Action Cinema RPG; while Garcia liked the idea, his first priority was his own setting, Nexus: The Infinite City which was published in 1994 with Garcia as the main designer and developer, and Laws, Bruce Baugh, and Rob Heinsoo as additional authors. Daedalus Games was incorporated as Daedalus Entertainment in preparation for publishing in the Hong Kong action setting Laws had designed, but beginning with a collectible-card game to take advantage of that then-booming market.; Laws therefore designed the collectible card game Shadowfist (1995). Daedalus Entertainment subsequently published Laws' role-playing game Feng Shui (1996), which used a variant of the Nexus game system, and began to publish supplements. However, Daedalus filed for chapter 11 bankruptcy protection in 1997; when the company sold off a few of its properties a few years later, Laws re-acquired "Feng Shui". Nephew told Laws that he would be happy to bring Feng Shui back into print, so when Laws was able to free up the rights he brought it to Atlas Games, in a deal announced on March 22, 1999.

Meanwhile, Laws was active throughout the 1990s as a freelance writer for games including GURPS, Underground, Talislanta, Earthdawn, and Vampire: The Dark Ages, and later for supplements to the third edition of Dungeons & Dragons. In 1998, Greg Stafford approached Laws to create a new game based on his world of Glorantha, which became known as Hero Wars, published in 2000 as the first fully professional product for Issaries, and later expanded and re-published in 2003 as HeroQuest. A second edition was published in 2009; Laws was then able to provide additional scaffolding for players to construct setting-appropriate narratives with the rules provided. At the same time, Laws was engaged in some more experimental RPG design. Hogshead Publishing published his Pantheon and Other Roleplaying Games (2000) as one of the company's "New Style" RPGs, while Atlas Games contracted Laws to write the Rune (2001) role-playing game, based on the computer game Rune. Laws determined that for Rune, "the game would need to have a big point of difference to distinguish it from the many other fantasy games available"; in this case, the game would allow players to swap roles with the Game Master (GM): "You can win! And when you're not the GM, it's not boring because the GM can win!"

Pelgrane Press revealed on January 20, 2000 that Laws would be the core author of their upcoming roleplaying game based on the Jack Vance stories in the Dying Earth setting. Laws was the senior designer for The Dying Earth Roleplaying Game. As Pelgrane Press expanded, they launched the GUMSHOE system, designed by Laws based on the claim that investigative gaming had been introduced to RPGs under the mistaken assumption that acquiring clues should be treated as a contingent reward; the new system ensured that players would learn the clues needed in order to proceed with their investigations. Laws' The Esoterrorists (2006) was the first release with this system, supported by his sourcebook The Esoterror Factbook (2006); the next year, Pelgrane released Laws' Fear Itself (2007). Laws has also contributed supplements to Ken Hite's Trail of Cthulhu line, notably the randomized Armitage Files resource and the Dreamhounds of Paris campaign frame, in which players take on the roles of actual surrealist artists as they confront horror in the Dreamlands. Laws also designed Mutant City Blues (2009) and Ashen Stars (2011) as investigative games in the superhero and space opera genres.  His RPG Skulduggery (2010) extrapolated the treatment of conflict, especially interpersonal conflict, from the Dying Earth setting to a variety of other contexts, and the Gaean Reach RPG (2012) cross-fertilized Dying Earth and GUMSHOE rules in Vance's sci-fi setting.

In 2012, Laws also ran a Kickstarter for his game Hillfolk, featuring his new Dramasystem. The goal was $3,000, but raised over $93,000, and it went on to win the 2014 Diana Jones Award. After another successful Kickstarter by Atlas Games, Laws released a second edition of Feng Shui twenty years after its original release, removing obstructive rules and marking a "critical shift" in the game's background. Laws has since published the specialized Cthulhu Confidential (2017), offering a modified GUMSHOE system for roleplaying with one player and the GM, and the Yellow King RPG inspired by Robert W. Chambers (2020), also for Pelgrane Press.

Author
Robin D. Laws published his first novel Pierced Heart in 1996, set in the world of Over the Edge; it was released as an e-book in 2014. His subsequent novels included the original The Rough and the Smooth as well as novels set in the game settings of Warhammer Fantasy Roleplay, City of Heroes and Pathfinder. Laws also had stories published in Synister Creative's pulp magazine, and in the fiction anthology The Book of All Flesh for the All Flesh Must Be Eaten RPG: "The first is a light-hearted adventure, and the other is really, really dark". Laws wrote Robin's Laws of Good Game Mastering (2002) for Steve Jackson Games and edited 40 Years of Gen Con (2007), a collection of interviews and photographs, published by Atlas. Laws also wrote Hamlet's Hit Points (2010), published by small press company Gameplaywright, and is currently working on a second volume, applying the same approach to narrative structure with a focus on fiction and screenplay writing. Laws is also the editor of the Stone Skin Press fiction imprint from Pelgrane Press.

In other media, he contributed to the King of Dragon Pass and Six Ages computer games and wrote for Marvel's Iron Man with Mike Grell in 2003. He writes an irregular advice column for role-players called See Page XX, and releases a weekly podcast with Ken Hite for Pelgrane Press, Ken and Robin talk about stuff.

Conventions
Robin Laws is frequently invited to be a guest speaker at conventions around the world, having made appearances at Gen Con Australia and Ropecon in Finland.

Laws attends Gen Con Indy and the Toronto International Film Festival every year. He has stated that he often cannot attend Fan Expo Canada because that convention often takes place too soon after Gen Con and too soon before TIFF, but he likes to attend it whenever he can. He was Fan Expo's gaming guest of honor in 2005 and 2010.

Since 2010, Laws has participated in Dragonmeet in London as a guest of Pelgrane Press.

Works
A partial list of works by Robin D Laws:

Role-playing games and related supplements
For 13th Age:

 13 True Ways

Ashen Stars

Cthulhu Confidential

For Deadlands: Hell on Earth
 Monsters, Muties and Misfits (et al.)

For Dungeons and Dragons:
 Dungeon Master's Guide II (et al.)
 Seven Strongholds (Atlas Games Penumbra)

For the Earthdawn RPG:
 Throal: The Dwarf Kingdom
 Infected
 Horrors
 Denizens of Earthdawn (Volume 2)
 The Theran Empire
 Parlainth Adventures (et al.)

The Esoterrorists
 The Esoterror Factbook
Fear Itself

Feng Shui: Action Movie Roleplaying
 Four Bastards
 Burning Shaolin

For the Firefly Role-Playing Game:
 Ghosts In the Black

Gaean Reach RPG

For Greg Stafford's Glorantha setting

 Glorantha: the Second Age and associated supplements
 HeroQuest first and second editions
 Hero Wars and associated supplements

For GURPS:
 Fantasy 2: Adventures in the Mad Lands

Hillfolk

Jack Vance's The Dying Earth Roleplaying Game
 Kaiin Player's Guide
 Turjan's Tome of Beauty and Horror (with Ian Thompson)
 Cugel's Compendium of Indispensable Advantages (et al.)
 The Excellent Prismatic Spray 2-5 (et al.)

Mutant City Blues
 Hard Helix

Nexus: The Infinite City (et al.)

OG: Unearthed Edition

For Over the Edge:
 Unauthorized Broadcast
 Weather the Cuckoo Likes
 Wildest Dreams
 Over the Edge, 2nd Edition (with Jonathan Tweet)

Pandemonium!: Adventures in Tabloid World (Contributor)
 Stranger Than Truth: Further Adventures in Tabloid World (Contributor)

Pantheon and Other Roleplaying Games

Robin's Laws of Good Game Mastering

Rune

Shadowfist Players' Guide (Volume 1) (with Rob Heinsoo)

Star Trek RPG (et al.)

Star Trek: The Next Generation RPG (et al.)
 Raiders, Renegades, & Rogues (et al.)

For Talislanta:
 Sub-men Rising

For Trail of Cthulhu
 The Armitage Files
 Out of Space Scenario: Repairer of Reputations
 Stunning Eldritch Tales
 Dreamhounds of Paris

For the Underground RPG:
 Ways and Means

For Vampire: The Dark Ages:
 House of Tremere

For Vampire: the Masquerade:
 Blood Magic: Secrets of Thaumaturgy

For Warhammer Fantasy Roleplay
 Heart of Chaos (Doomstones Campaign Volume 3)

Novels
 Pierced Heart
 The Rough and the Smooth
 Honour of the Grave
 Sacred Flesh
 Liar's Peak
 Freedom Phalanx
 Pathfinder Tales: The Worldwound Gambit
 Pathfinder Tales: Blood of the City
 The Missing and the Lost

References

External links
Robin Laws' Blogspot journal

See Page XX RPG advice column
RPGnet Index Entry
Interview on Flames Rising (March 2011)

1964 births
Atlas Games people
Canadian game designers
Canadian podcasters
Chaosium game designers
Dungeons & Dragons game designers
GURPS writers
Living people
People from Orillia
Role-playing game designers
Role-playing game writers
Warhammer Fantasy Roleplay game designers
White Wolf game designers